Ellen Rae Greenberg (June 23, 1983 - January 26, 2011) was a 27-year-old first grade teacher at Juniata Park Academy in Philadelphia, Pennsylvania. Ellen, an only child, was born in New York City, New York to Joshua (Josh) and Sandra (Sandee) Greenberg.

Incident
On January 26, 2011, a blizzard hit Philadelphia, prompting Ellen Greenberg to leave work and return to her Manayunk apartment, where she lived with her fiancé Samuel (Sam) Goldberg, a Gladwyne-based television producer for NBC and later Golf.com. At approximately 6:40 p.m. that evening, Ellen was pronounced dead as a result of twenty stab wounds, including ten to her back and neck. There were also eleven bruises in various stages of resolution on Ellen's right arm, abdomen, and right leg. However, despite there being no suicide note, the crime scene was treated as a suicide.

Following the autopsy, the Philadelphia Medical Examiner's Office initially ruled the case as a homicide. However, the next day, the Philadelphia Police Department backtracked and stated that, "the death of Ellen Greenberg has not been ruled a homicide…Homicide investigators are considering the manner of death as suspicious at this time." The case was reversed and officially ruled a suicide in February 2011.

Further investigation
On March 15, 2019, The Philadelphia Inquirer released a front-page investigative report reviewing the suspicious circumstances surrounding the death of Ellen Greenberg. Pittsburgh forensic pathologist Cyril H. Wecht, who famously challenged the single-bullet theory of the John F. Kennedy assassination, reviewed the case and determined it was "strongly suspicious of homicide" also stated, "I don't know how they wrote this off as a suicide." Similarly, forensic scientist Henry Lee, who testified for the defense in the O. J. Simpson murder trial reviewed the case files and concluded, "[t]he number and types of wounds and bloodstain patterns observed are consistent with a homicide scene."

One significant point of contention were the stab wounds that penetrated Ellen Greenberg's brain. Dr. Wayne K. Ross wrote that the stab wounds to the brain and spinal cord would have caused severe pain, cranial nerve dysfunction, and traumatic brain injuries. The original medical report stated that neuropathologist Dr. Lucy Rorke-Adams determined there was no such wound. However, when interviewed by The Philadelphia Inquirer, Dr. Rorke revealed she did not observe Greenberg's body and confirmed she has no records (bill, invoice, or report) of the examination.

Legal action
In October 2019, Ellen Greenberg's parents filed a civil suit against the Philadelphia Medical Examiner's Office and Dr. Marlon Osbourne, the pathologist who conducted the autopsy, in the Philadelphia Court of Common Pleas. The suit seeks to change the manner of death to "homicide" or "undetermined" citing new information and the fact that Dr. Osbourne admitted to changing the manner of death at the insistence of the police. A new technology called photogrammetry, unavailable at the time of Ellen's death, created a 3D anatomical recreation of Ellen's wounds, demonstrating that not all 20 wounds could have been self-inflicted.

Ellen Greenberg's parents scored a significant legal victory in January 2020, when the Philadelphia Court of Common Pleas allowed the case to proceed past the motion to dismiss stage. The trial was set to begin in 2021.

In August 2022, the Chester County District Attorney’s office announced it would reopen investigation into Greenberg’s death. This was on the heels of the Pennsylvania Attorney General’s statement that they were relinquishing the case due to a conflict of interest.

Media coverage
Following The Philadelphia Inquirer investigation, the case became a sensation in the true crime community. Ellen Greenberg's story was featured in the Dr. Oz Show, People Magazine, 48 Hours, Inside Edition, The Philadelphia Inquirer, CBS Philadelphia, Good Day Philadelphia (FOX29 Philly), ABC Harrisburg, CBS Harrisburg, Penn Live, NBC's Oxygen network, the Daily Mail (UK), Law.com, and FreakTV (Portuguese). The suspicion surrounding Greenberg's death was also the lead episode in second season of the true crime television show, Accident, Suicide Or Murder.

A number of podcasts have also detailed Greenberg's death, including the Criminology Podcast (featuring Cyril H. Wecht), Sinisterhood, Catch My Killer, Generation Why, Strange and Unexplained, Killer Podcast, Late Night Crimecsat, Sideline Sleuths,bg Bouquet of Madness, Women & Crime, Crime Junkie and Morbid: A True Crime Podcast. It has also been covered on many true crime Youtube channels.

References

1983 births
2011 deaths
2011 in Pennsylvania
2011 murders in the United States
Capital murder cases
Crimes in Philadelphia
January 2011 events in the United States
Incidents of violence against women
Violence against women in the United States